The Department of Defense Distinguished Civilian Service Award is the highest civilian award given by the United States Department of Defense. This award and accompanying Distinguished Civilian Service Medal is the department's highest award given to career DoD civilian employees whose careers reflect exceptional devotion to duty and whose contributions to the efficiency, economy, or other improvements in DoD operations are of a significantly broad scope

First recipient
Originally, the Distinguished Civilian Service Medal was awarded by United States Department of War for work in the intelligence service. Earl H. Pritchard was the first recipient of the award for his service from 1942 to 1945 when he was a civilian analyst with military intelligence during the Second World War.

See also
Awards and decorations of the United States government

References
Secretary of Defense Honorary Awards
2015 DOD press release
2014 DOD press release
DONHQ
DOD press release

Defense Distinguished Civilian Service Award